George A. Hansell Jr. (1911 – January 25, 1998) was an American football and track coach.  He served as the head football coach at Pennsylvania Military College—now known Widener University from 1953 to 1961, compiling a record of 50–23.  Hansell also coached track at Widener from 1946 to 1974.

References

External links
 Widener Hall of Fame profile

1911 births
1998 deaths
Dickinson Red Devils football players
Widener Pride football coaches
College track and field coaches in the United States
People from Narberth, Pennsylvania
Players of American football from Pennsylvania